Odirlei Carlos Pessoni (1 July 1982 – 27 March 2021) was a Brazilian bobsledder. He competed for Brazil at the 2014 Winter Olympics in the four-man competition and at the 2018 Winter Olympics also in the four-man where he placed in 29th position out of 30 teams along with Edson Bindilatti, Edson Martins and Fábio Gonçalves Silva.

Pessoni died in a motorcycle accident on 27 March 2021.

References

External links
 
 

1982 births
2021 deaths
Brazilian male bobsledders
Olympic bobsledders of Brazil
Bobsledders at the 2014 Winter Olympics
Bobsledders at the 2018 Winter Olympics
People from Franca
Road incident deaths in Brazil
Motorcycle road incident deaths
Sportspeople from São Paulo (state)